Ganesh Prasad Rijal (11 May 1920 – 4 April 1998) was a Nepali politician. He took part in the 1951 democratic revolution of Nepal and later in 1959, elected as a member of parliament from Ilam district. On 15 December 1960, King Mahendra suspended the constitution, dissolved the elected parliament, dismissed the cabinet, imposed direct rule and imprisoned the then prime minister Bishweshwar Prasad Koirala and his closest government colleagues. After King Mahendra's coup, Rijal was exiled to India along with other leaders and workers of Nepali Congress party. During his exile, he resided in Kalimpong and Naxalbari in Indian state of West Bengal. He returned homeland in 1975 following government granting amnesty, and continued his political career, residing in Damak and Kathmandu simultaneously.

Rijal died on 4 April 1998 in Damak in Jhapa district of Nepal due to cardiac arrest.

References

See also
History of Nepal
Politics of Nepal

1920 births
1998 deaths
People from Panchthar District
Nepali Congress politicians from Koshi Province
Nepalese exiles
Nepal MPs 1959–1960